Graeme Robert Beard (born 19 August 1950) is a former Australian cricketer who played in three Test matches and two One Day Internationals in 1980 and 1981.

Beard was born in Auburn, New South Wales. He made his debut for New South Wales in 1975 against the touring West Indies cricket team. He played as a batsman in this match and scored 0 and 0. He later established himself in the NSW side in the 1979–80 series as an all-rounder, who bowled off spin and medium pace, and was chosen to go on tour with the national Australian side to Pakistan. He played in all three Test matches of that tour playing a few dogged innings (39 and 49 in the 3rd Test at Lahore) and took one wicket (1 for 26 in the 3rd Test).

Beard was called up by Australian one day side during the 1980–81 World Series Cup competition. He played his only two matches during the finals series versus New Zealand, the second match being the infamous underarm bowling incident. Beard went on the Ashes tour 1981 but did not play in the Tests.

After the 1981–82 season Beard left first-class cricket and his other job as a teacher to work for the Australian Workers' Union.

References

External links

1950 births
Living people
Australia Test cricketers
Australia One Day International cricketers
New South Wales cricketers
Australian cricketers
Cricketers from Sydney